Kevin Wilson is an American writer from Sewanee, Tennessee. His stories have been published in Ploughshares, Tin House, One Story, and The Cincinnati Review. They have also been included in four volumes of the New Stories from the South: The Year's Best anthology.

Wilson is a graduate of the MFA program at the University of Florida. He teaches writing at Sewanee: The University of the South.

Published works and awards won
 Tunneling to the Center of the Earth (2009): won Alex Award from the American Library Association and the Shirley Jackson Award.
 The Family Fang (2011)
 Perfect Little World (2017)
 Baby, You're Gonna Be Mine (2018)
 Nothing to See Here (2019)
 Now is not the Time to Panic (2022)

References

External links
Official website

Writers from Tennessee
University of Florida alumni
Living people
People from Sewanee, Tennessee
Year of birth missing (living people)